Bright Chimezie (born 1 October 1960) is a musician from Abia State, Nigeria and is married to Chinyere Chimezie.  

His music style became known as Zigima Sound. It is a genre which became popular in the Eastern part of Nigeria in the early 1980s. It is a mix of traditional Nigerian music and Igbo highlife fused with chanted vocals. Bright Chimezie used it to revolutionize the musical structure in Nigeria with lyrics that focused on social issues of the country in a rather funny way.

Bright Chimezie made songs like 'Ube Nwanne', 'because of English' , African style. his album Respect Africa brought him to Limelight as he used these songs to ridicule problems in the society. He is also known for his dance steps. popularly known as legwork. His stylish way of mixing excellent steps and a warning chant gave him the title ' the duke of African music'. 

He is happily married to Chinyere Chimezie and together they have five children.

References 

1960 births
Living people
Igbo highlife musicians
Igbo-language singers
20th-century Nigerian male singers
21st-century Nigerian male singers
Musicians from Umuahia